Vincent Wong Ho Shun (born 7 July 1983) is a Hong Kong actor and singer currently contracted to TVB and Shaw Brothers Pictures.

Wong had won the TVB Anniversary Award for Best Actor with his role in the Legal Mavericks series in 2017 and 2020 respectively.

Early life and career
Wong was born in Xinjiang. His father is a Han Chinese while his mother is a Uyghur. He moved to Hong Kong when he was a child. Wong studied graphic design at the Hong Kong Art School, and worked as a designer before he was scouted by a talent agent in 2004. Wong attended The Colorado Springs School in the United States. In 2005, Wong debuted as a singer under the record label Neway Star with his first single "訊號 (Signal)" and released an album with Neway.

In 2008, Wong joined TVB and made his acting debut in the drama Wars of In-Laws II. With his role in the 2010 drama Gun Metal Grey, he earned his first Best Supporting Actor nomination at the 2010 TVB Anniversary Awards and won My Favourite Most Promising Male Artiste award at the 2011 My AOD Favourites Award. Wong won the Most Improved Male Artiste award at the 2013 TVB Anniversary Awards. 

With his role in the 2014 drama Tomorrow Is Another Day, Wong earned his first nomination for the Most Popular Male Character at the 2014 TVB Anniversary Awards and won My Favourite TVB Supporting Actor award at the 2015 StarHub TVB Award. In 2015, Wong took on his first male leading role in the drama Brick Slaves, garnering his first Best Actor nomination at the 2015 TVB Anniversary Awards.

Wong gained recognition with his role as "Ditch" in the 2016 drama Over Run Over. His onscreen partnership with Tracy Chu was well received, for which he won the Most Popular Onscreen Partnership award with Chu at the 2016 TVB Anniversary Awards. Furthermore, he was placed in the top five nominations for Best Actor and Most Popular Male Character.
 
With his role as the blind barrister "Hope Man" in the 2017 critically acclaimed drama Legal Mavericks, Wong won My Favourite TVB Actor award at the StarHub TVB Awards and the Best Actor award at the TVB Anniversary Awards. With the same role in the sequel Legal Mavericks 2020, he won TVB Anniversary Award for Best Actor award again as well as the Favourite TVB Actor in Malaysia award. Also, together with Owen Cheung and Brian Chu, Wong won the Most Popular Onscreen Partnership award with the 2020 comedy drama Al Cappuccino.

In 2021, Wong starred opposite veterans Kara Wai and Philip Keung in the crime thriller Murder Diary, portraying a dissociative identity disorder character — the police undercover agent "Ip King-fung", the graphologist and criminal profiler "Chu Kei", and the fourteen-year-old "Matt".

Personal life
Wong got married with TVB actress Yoyo Chen on 11 November 2011. Their daughter was born in April 2012.

Filmography

Television dramas (TVB)

Television dramas (Shaw Brothers Pictures)

Film

Discography

Albums

TVB drama theme songs

Other songs

Acting awards

TVB Anniversary Awards

StarHub TVB Awards

My AOD Favourites Awards

TVB Star Awards Malaysia

People's Choice Television Awards

Hong Kong Television Awards

Yahoo！Asia Buzz Awards

Music awards

Jade Solid Gold Best 10 Awards Presentation

TVB Anniversary Awards

Other awards

References

External links
 Official Yahoo Blog of Vincent Wong

1983 births
Living people
Cantopop singers
21st-century Hong Kong male actors
Hong Kong male film actors
Hong Kong male singers
Hong Kong male television actors
TVB actors
Male actors from Xinjiang
Uyghur people